Cenangium is a genus of fungi in the family Helotiaceae. The genus contains 25 species. The type species Cenangium ferruginosum causes dieback of pines.

Species

See also

 Forest pathology

References

Helotiaceae